Interstellar Probe is the name of a 1999 space probe concept by NASA intended to travel out 200 AU in 15 years. This 1999 study by Jet Propulsion Laboratory (JPL) is noted for its circular 400 meters diameter, solar sail as a propulsion method (1 g/m2) combined with a 0.25 AU flyby of the Sun to achieve higher solar light pressure, after which the sail is jettisoned at 5 AU distance from the Sun.

Solar sail
Solar sails work by converting the energy in light into a momentum on the spacecraft, thus propelling the spacecraft. Felix Tisserand noted the effect of light pressure on comet tails in the 1800s.

The study by the NASA Jet Propulsion Laboratory, proposed using a solar sail to accelerate a spacecraft to reach the interstellar medium. It was planned to reach as far as 200 AU within 10 years at a speed of 14 AU/year (about 70 km/s, and function up to 400+ AU. A critical technology for the mission is a large 1 g/m2 solar sail. 

In the following years there were additional studies, including the Innovative Interstellar Explorer (published 2003), which focused on a design using RTGs powering an ion engine rather than a solar sail. Another project in this field for advanced spaceflight during this period was the Breakthrough Propulsion Physics Program which ran from 1996 through 2002.

Later examples of solar sail-propelled spacecraft include IKAROS, Nanosail-D2, and LightSail. Near-Earth Asteroid Scout is a planned light sail-propelled mission. For comparison, the LightSail spacecraft uses a sail 5 micron in thickness, whereas they predict a sail with 1 micron thickness would be needed for interstellar travel.

Other design features
The probe would use an advanced radioisotope thermoelectric generator (RTG) for electrical power, Ka band radio for communication with Earth, a Delta 2 rocket for Earth launch, and a 25 kg instrument package using 20 watts.

Objectives

Historical view of region

See also

Interstellar probe (generic)
 Breakthrough Starshot, a fleet of small light sail spacecraft
 
 TAU (spacecraft) (1980s era interstellar precursor and astrometry probe)
 Stardust (spacecraft) (Believed to have collected some interstellar micro-dust)
 Interstellar Boundary Explorer (Space observatory that detects neutral atoms from beyond)

References

External links
NASA - Interstellar Probe

Proposed space probes
Interstellar travel
1999 in science